Tathong may refer to: 
 Tathong Channel, the eastern sea waters in Hong Kong leading into Victoria Harbour through Lei Yue Mun
 Chainarong Tathong, Thai footballer
 Wuttichai Tathong, Thai footballer